Lieutenant-General Arthur Richard Wellesley, 2nd Duke of Wellington,  (3 February 1807 – 13 August 1884), styled Lord Douro between 1812 and 1814 and Marquess of Douro between 1814 and 1852, was a British soldier and politician. The eldest son of Arthur Wellesley, 1st Duke of Wellington, victor of Waterloo and Prime Minister, he succeeded his father in the dukedom in 1852 and held minor political office as Master of the Horse from 1853 to 1858. In 1858, he was made a Knight of the Garter.

Background and education
Wellesley was born at Harley Street, Marylebone, London, the eldest son of Arthur Wellesley, 1st Duke of Wellington, and the Honourable Catherine Sarah Dorothea "Kitty" Pakenham, daughter of Edward Pakenham, 2nd Baron Longford. Lord Charles Wellesley was his younger brother and Lord Wellesley, Lord Mornington and Lord Cowley his uncles. He was educated at Temple Grove School, Eton College, Christ Church, Oxford, and Trinity College, Cambridge. He became known by the courtesy title Lord Douro when his father was created Earl of Wellington in 1812 and as Marquess of Douro in 1814 after his father was elevated to a dukedom.

Military career
Lord Douro became an ensign in the 81st Regiment of Foot in 1823 and in the 71st (Highland) Regiment of Foot in 1825, a cornet in the Royal Horse Guards in 1825, a lieutenant in the Royal Horse Guards in 1827, a captain in the Royal Horse Guards in 1828 and in the King's Royal Rifle Corps the same year, a major in the King's Royal Rifle Corps in 1830 and in the Rifle Brigade in 1831, a lieutenant-colonel on the unattached list in 1834, a brevet colonel in 1846, a lieutenant-colonel in the Victoria (Middlesex) Rifle Volunteer Corps in 1853 and a major-general in 1854.

Political career
Lord Douro was elected to parliament for the rotten borough of Aldeburgh in 1829, a seat he held until its abolition by the Reform Act of 1832. He was out of parliament until 1837, when he was returned for Norwich. In 1852 he succeeded his father in the dukedom and entered the House of Lords. In early 1853 he was sworn of the Privy Council and appointed Master of the Horse in Lord Aberdeen's coalition government, a post he retained when Lord Palmerston became prime minister in 1855. He resigned along with the rest of the Palmerston government in 1858. The latter year he was made a Knight of the Garter.

In 1863, Wellington inherited the earldom of Mornington on the death of his cousin William Pole-Tylney-Long-Wellesley, 5th Earl of Mornington. From 1868 to 1884 he was Lord-Lieutenant of Middlesex.

Family and personal legacy

Wellington married Lady Elizabeth Hay, daughter of Field Marshal George Hay, 8th Marquess of Tweeddale, in 1839. They had no children. The marriage was not a happy one although Lady Elizabeth was a great favourite with her father-in-law. On succeeding his illustrious father he was said to have remarked: "Imagine what it will be when the Duke of Wellington is announced, and only I walk in the room." The relationship between father and son is often described as the classic case of the son of a famous father who cannot match such fame. Wellington died at Brighton Railway Station, Brighton, Sussex, in August 1884, aged 77, and was buried at the family seat Stratfield Saye House, Hampshire. He was succeeded by his nephew, Henry. The Duchess died at Bearhill (Burhill) Park (House), Hersham, Surrey, in August 1904, aged 83, and was buried at Stratfield Saye. Her probate left assets of £13,997.

In literature
The Brontë family portrayed the first Duke of Wellington and his two sons in their imaginary games about the colonisation of Africa. They wrote many stories about Arthur, with Charlotte assuming the character of Charles as the "author" of these stories. As Charlotte and Branwell moved into their teenage years and used Lord Byron's writings as inspiration, they focused on Arthur as a romantic, heroic figure. He was known to them as the Duke of Zamorna, and later as Emperor Adrian of Angria. Elements of his character formed the basis for Edward Rochester in Jane Eyre.

Thomas Raikes ("the Younger"), a British merchant banker, dandy and diarist, was a close childhood friend, travelling and gambling companion of Arthur Wellesley, 2nd Duke of Wellington. His journals Two volumes of Private Correspondence with the 2nd Duke of Wellington and other Distinguished Contemporaries were published in 1861.

Styles
3 February 1807 – 26 August 1809: Arthur Richard Wellesley, Esq.
26 August 1809 – 28 February 1812: Hon. Arthur Richard Wellesley, Esq.
28 February 1812 – 3 May 1814: Lord Douro
3 May 1814 – 14 September 1852: Marquess of Douro
14 September 1852 – 7 February 1853: His Grace The Duke of Wellington
7 February 1853 – 25 March 1858: His Grace The Duke of Wellington PC
25 March 1858 – 13 August 1884: His Grace The Duke of Wellington KG, PC

References

External links

1807 births
1884 deaths
English people of Irish descent
People educated at Temple Grove School
Alumni of Christ Church, Oxford
Alumni of Trinity College, Cambridge
Arthur Wellesley, 2nd Duke of Wellington
British Army generals
Children of prime ministers of the United Kingdom
102
2nd
102
Knights of the Garter
Lord-Lieutenants of Middlesex
Members of the Privy Council of the United Kingdom
Douro, Arthur Wellesley, Marquess
102
Wellesley, Arthur 2
Douro, Arthur Wellesley, Marquess
Douro, Arthur Wellesley, Marquess
Douro, Arthur Wellesley, Marquess
Douro, Arthur Wellesley, Marquess
Douro, Arthur Wellesley, Marquess
Douro, Arthur Wellesley, Marquess
UK MPs who inherited peerages
King's Royal Rifle Corps officers
Rifle Brigade officers
Military personnel from London
Royal Horse Guards officers
81st Regiment of Foot officers
71st Highlanders officers
Volunteer Force officers in Middlesex units
Earls of Mornington
People educated at Eton College